USA 202, previously NRO Launch 26 or NROL-26, is a classified spacecraft which is operated by the United States National Reconnaissance Office. It is an Advanced Orion ELINT satellite. According to Aviation Week, it "fundamentally involves America's biggest, most secret and expensive military spacecraft on board the world's largest rocket." The combined cost of the spacecraft and launch vehicle has been estimated to be over US$2 billion.

Amateur astronomer observations suspected the satellite was eavesdropping on Thuraya 2 and this was reported to be confirmed by documents released on Sep 9, 2016 by The Intercept as part of the Snowden Files.

Launch 
USA-202 was launched from Space Launch Complex 37B at the Cape Canaveral Air Force Station, on the third flight of a Delta IV Heavy rocket. The launch was originally scheduled for 2005, but was delayed due to a number of issues, and lift-off took place at 02:47 GMT on 18 January 2009.

References

External links 

 Delta IV Heavy NROL-26 - launch information from ULA.
 The USA 202 ORION satellite A technical analysis of the satellite

National Reconnaissance Office satellites
Spacecraft launched in 2009
Spacecraft launched by Delta IV rockets
USA satellites